Efraín Antonio Burgos Jr. (born 14 August 1988), better known as Junior Burgos, is a Salvadoran professional footballer who currently plays for Alianza FC and the El Salvador national team.

Career

College and Amateur
Burgos grew up in San Bruno, California, attended Westmoor High School, and played two years of college soccer at San Jose State University before transferring to California Polytechnic State University in San Luis Obispo, California as a junior in 2008. He scored seven goals in 28 appearances as a Mustang before graduating in the fall of 2010. Burgos became the first Cal Poly player in history to ever be drafted in the MLS SuperDraft.

During his college years Burgos also played in the Premier Development League, for the San Francisco Seals, Bakersfield Brigade and Chicago Fire Premier.

Professional
On 13 January 2011, Burgos was selected in the third round of the 2011 MLS SuperDraft by Toronto FC. He signed with Toronto FC on 21 March 2012. Burgos made his debut for Toronto as a second half sub for Julian De Guzman against Columbus Crew on March 31, 2012. Burgos was released by Toronto FC on 28 June 2012.

He spent time training abroad including places such as Germany with FC Energie Cottbus of the 2. Bundesliga and Chile with Club Deportivo Universidad Católica. On 26 February 2014, he signed with Atlanta Silverbacks of the North American Soccer League. Burgos led the Silverbacks with 3 goals and 3 assists in the club's historic 2014 Lamar Hunt US Open Cup, eliminating Real Salt Lake and the Colorado Rapids before being eliminated by Chicago Fire in the quarterfinal stage.

On 4 February 2015 it was announced that Burgos had signed to Colombian club Jaguares de Córdoba, which plays in the Categoría Primera A Colombians highest league, where he would rejoin former Silverbacks teammate Junior Sandoval.

He decided to part ways with the Colombian side after the club refused to meet the terms of the signed contract between both parties. Shortly after, he signed temporarily with Orange County Blues FC of USL in April 2015, as a transition move before the summer window opened up.

After appearing in 4 games for Orange County Blues, Burgos rejoined Atlanta Silverbacks on 7 July 2015. Burgos, went on to score 4 goals and 6 assists making it a successful return to Atlanta. Burgos free kick goal vs San Antonio was nominated as the 2015 NASL Goal of the year. He was presented with an award during half time at the NASL Championship match.

On 2 February 2016 it was announced that Burgos signed with Major League Soccer's Atlanta United FC, becoming the second signing in the club's history, ahead of their 2017 MLS debut. Burgos was loaned out to the Tampa Bay Rowdies for the 2016 campaign in the North American Soccer League.

Burgos was waived by Atlanta in December 2016, ahead of their inaugural season.

On 4 March 2020, Burgos joined USL Championship side Las Vegas Lights FC ahead of the 2020 season.

Burgos joined Chalatenango on 25 February 2021.

International
Burgos is a member of El Salvador's national team. He made his international debut on 30 August 2014 vs Dominican Republic, where he assisted on the 2–0 win.

In September 2014, Burgos was named to the UNCAF cup 21 men roster, making his official international debut on all competitions in the 1–0 win over Honduras.

Burgos first got called in to represent his country prior to the country's September 2010 friendlies versus Honduras and Guatemala, and was previously invited to the El Salvador camp prior to a 2009 friendly versus Peru and World Cup qualifiers versus the United States and Costa Rica.

International goals
Scores and results list Italy's goal tally first.

Personal life

Burgos has one older sister, Sofia, and two younger siblings, Gerardo and Fatima. His mother is Morena Del Carmen de Burgos and his father is Salvadoran international Efrain Burgos, who played professional football for 16 years, mainly for Salvadoran clubs.

Honours

Toronto FC
Canadian Championship (1): 2012

References

External links
Cal Poly bio
San Jose State Spartans bio

1988 births
Living people
Sportspeople from Santa Ana, El Salvador
Salvadoran footballers
Association football midfielders
Toronto FC draft picks
Toronto FC players
C.D. FAS footballers
Primera División de Fútbol Profesional players
El Salvador international footballers
2014 Copa Centroamericana players
2017 CONCACAF Gold Cup players
Salvadoran expatriate footballers
Salvadoran expatriate sportspeople in Canada
Expatriate soccer players in Canada
Salvadoran emigrants to the United States
Naturalized citizens of the United States
People from San Bruno, California
Sportspeople from the San Francisco Bay Area
Soccer players from California
San Jose State Spartans men's soccer players
Cal Poly Mustangs men's soccer players
San Francisco Seals (soccer) players
Bakersfield Brigade players
Chicago Fire U-23 players
Atlanta Silverbacks players
Orange County SC players
Tampa Bay Rowdies players
Reno 1868 FC players
New York Cosmos (2010) players
Las Vegas Lights FC players
USL League Two players
Major League Soccer players
North American Soccer League players
USL Championship players
American sportspeople of Salvadoran descent
American expatriate soccer players
American expatriate sportspeople in Canada